Sudan (also Romanized as Sūdān and Soodan; also known as Khadain, Khāden, Khādeyn, and Sodan Umūr) is a village in Gheyzaniyeh Rural District, in the Central District of Ahvaz County, Khuzestan Province, Iran. At the 2006 census, its population was 292, in 43 families.

References 

Populated places in Ahvaz County